Plymouth Church may refer to:

Plymouth Church (Brooklyn), on the National Register of Historic Places
Plymouth Church, Des Moines, Iowa, in Des Moines, Iowa
Plymouth Church of Shaker Heights, in Shaker Heights, Ohio
Plymouth Church Seattle, in Seattle, Washington